Vicentini is a surname. Notable people with the surname include:

Juliano Vicentini (born 1981), Brazilian footballer
Luis Vicentini (1902–1938), Chilean boxer
Roberto Vicentini (1878–1953), Catholic archbishop, Vatican official

See also
Puerto Vicentini, village in Argentina